The 1921–22 SK Rapid Wien season was the 24th season in club history.

Squad

Squad and statistics

Squad statistics

Fixtures and results

League

Cup

References

1921-22 Rapid Wien Season
Rapid